The Ministry of Justice (Abrv: MOJ;) is a cabinet ministry in the Government of Thailand. The ministry is in charge of the criminal justice system in the kingdom. As well as running prisons and aiding the Royal Thai Police, the ministry also runs the government's drug and narcotic control policies. The ministry is headed by the Minister of Justice, Somsak Thepsuthin. Its fiscal year 2020 budget is 26,757 million baht.

History
The ministry was established in 1891 by King Chulalongkorn (Rama V). The monarch centralized the court and judicial system of the country. The sixteen courts were combined into seven courts. In 1912, under King Vajiravudh (Rama VI), the ministry was divided when the Court of Justice was given responsibilities over judicial affairs and the ministry retained responsibility for the legal and administrative areas.

In 1991, the National Assembly of Thailand passed the Improvement of Government Organisation Act. Article 21 of the act indicated the ministry was to be responsible for the administration of the Courts of Justice (except for adjudications and the criminal justice system.

List of ministers

Departments

Administration
Office of the Minister's Secretary
Office of the Inspector General
Office of the Auditor
Office of the Permanent Secretary
Office of the Justice Affairs

Dependent departments
Department of Special Investigation
Central Institute of Forensic Science
Rights and Liberties Protection Department
Legal Execution Department
Department of Juvenile Observation and Protection
Department of Corrections
Department of Probation

Public organizations
Thailand Institute of Justice
Thailand Arbitration Center

Department directly under the justice minister
Office of the Narcotics Control Board (ONCB)
Office of Courts of Justice
Office of Constitutional Courts
Office Administrative Courts
Office of the Public Sector Anti-Corruption Commission (PACC)

See also

Cabinet of Thailand
Government of Thailand
Justice ministry
Law of Thailand
List of Government Ministers of Thailand
Politics of Thailand
รัฐมนตรีว่าการกระทรวงยุติธรรมของไทย (Thai Minister of Justice)

References

External links
Ministry of Justice Website in Thai
Ministry of Justice Website in English

 
Justice
Law of Thailand
1891 establishments in Siam
Thailand, Justice